The 2021-22 Regional Leagues of Spain are the regional football league of the Autonomous Communities of Spain, there 22 regional leagues, the firsts teams are promoted to Tercera División RFEF.

Aláva

Team changes

2020-21
The following club left the league before the season:
Amurrio Club-promoted to Tercera División RFEF

The following 5 clubs joined the league before the season:
Alipendi-promoted from Primera Regional

Ariznabarra-relegated from Tercera División RFEF

Lantarón-promoted from Primera Regional

Nanclares-promoted from Primera Regional

Urgatzi-relegated from Tercera División RFEF

2021-22
The following 7 clubs are left in the final of league:
Aranbizkarra-relegated to Primera Regional

Aurrerá de Vitoria-promoted to Tercera División RFEF

Sanmar-relegated to Primera Regional

Lantarón-relegated to Primera Regional

Mercedarias-relegated to Primera Regional

Rioja Alavesa Luzerna-relegated to Primera Regional

Vitoria B-relegated to Primera Regional

Regional Preferente

Group 1

Group 2

Promotion Playoffs

Relegation Playoffs

Primera Regional

Team Changes

2020-21
The following 5 clubs are left the league before the season:
Alipendi-Promoted to Regional Preferente

Lantarón-Promoted to Regional Preferente

Laudio B-Dissolved at the final of the league

Nanclares-Promoted to Regional Preferente

Salviaterra B-Dissolved at the final of league

The following 4 clubs joined the league before the season:
Adurtzabal-New club in the league

Amurrio Club B-New club in the league

Campezo-New Club in the league

Sendeja de Sopela-New Club in the league

2021-22
The following 1 club are left in the final of league:
Adurtzabal-Promoted to Regional Preferente

Table

Andaluzia

División de Honor

Group West

Group East

Primera Andaluza

Almería-Group 1

2021–22 in Spanish football leagues
Autonomous communities of Spain

Almería-Group 2